CUOA Foundation (Centro Universitario di Organizzazione Aziendale – University Centre of Business Administration) is one of the first Business School born in Italy in the 1950s, in an important period for managerial training in Italy.

 President: Federico Visentin
 General Manager: Giuseppe Caldiera
 Scientific Director: Alberto Felice De Toni

Founded in 1957 as a post -graduate school for secondary education within the University of Padua and as a Business School supported by enterprises, category associations, lending institutions, public bodies and the Universities of Padua, Trento, Trieste, Udine, Venice, Verona and IUAV - University of Venice.

The Foundation, with its more than 50 years of activity, developed relationships with about 3.000 companies and both national and international organisations. Fondazione CUOA manages more than 500 lecturers, didactic and scientific representatives and cooperates with 53 foreign countries and 26 foreign Universities and Business Schools.
The Foundation is a founder member of ASFOR,

, the association of Italian Business Schools. It is numbered among the first Italian Business School  and it is considered the most important in the north east of Italy.
.

Fondazione CUOA is hosted in the Villa Valmarana Morosini in Altavilla Vicentina, in the outskirts of Vicenza.

History 
CUOA Foundation was born in 1957 thanks to Lino Zanussi within the University of Padua’s Engineering Faculty, as a university centre for studies about business administration. Its first purpose was the creation of a post secondary specialization course in business organisation, its first edition started in 1958.

In 1959 CUOA became a post graduation school of business organization  and then a specialization school linked to University of Padua’s Engineering Faculty

In 1970 CUOA became a University Consortium for business organisation studies. The school moved to Lungargine Portello in Padua. The Consortium’s purposes were to assure the functioning of the specialization school in business organisation, to promote researches in the field of organisation, management, control of bodies or companies; to stimulate and implement initiatives and activities aimed at teaching subjects as organisation of industrial and commercial activities of these bodies and companies and to finance their activities.

Since 1980 Fondazione CUOA has been hosted in the Villa Valmarana Morosini, a magnificent 18th century building in Atavilla Vicentina . In the 1980s several activities for enterprises, banks and young people were developed thanks to the European Social Fund.

Between 1983 and 1986 the Universities of Venice, Verona, Trento and Udine took part to the consortium.

In the 1990s news changes were promoted: both organizational and about intervention areas.
The training started to gain an international size and the initiatives started to include new sectors, from the banks to other public administration divisions, strengthening at the same time the relationship with small - medium industries.

On  7 November 1997 a new phase of institutional renewal started: CUOA became a Foundation in order to strengthen the relationship with the territory and to develops its rule of cultural institution.

Presidents 
 Dal 2016 Federico Visentin
 2013 - 2016 Matteo Marzotto
 2007 - 2013 Vittorio Mincato
 2004 - 2007 Elio Marioni
 1992 - 2004 Gian Carlo Ferretto
 1990 - 1992 Ottone Visconti D'Oleggio
 1980 - 1990 Pilade Riello
 1970 - 1980 Mario Formenton
 1957 - 1970 Guido Ferro

Master Honoris Causa 
2016 - Carlo Messina
2015 - Brunello Cucinelli
2015 - Carlo Clavarino
2014 - Nerio Alessandri
2012 - Leonardo Del Vecchio
2011 - Federico Faggin
2010 - Mario Draghi
2009 - Enrico Bondi
2007 - Sergio Marchionne
2006 - Mario Moretti Polegato
2005 - Emma Marcegaglia
2005 - Vittorio Colao
2005 - Gianni Zonin
2004 - Mario Marangoni
2004 - Gianni Mion
2003 - Luca Cordero di Montezemolo
2003 - Alessandro Profumo
2002 - Giordano Veronesi
2002 - Ennio Doris
2001 - Vittorio Coin
2000 - Dino Marchiorello
2000 - Renzo Rosso
1999 - Gianfranco Zoppas
1997 - Ivano Beggio
1995 - Pietro Marzotto

See also 
 List of business schools in Europe
 List of Italian universities
 Vicenza

Notes

References 
 Charles Wankel e Bob DeFillippi, New Visions of Graduate Management Education, IAP, 2006..
 Fabrizio Gerli, La nuova formazione manageriale. Competenze, metodi ed esperienze, Roma, Carocci, 2002, pp. 65–196..
 Giovanni Costa e Enzo Rullani, Il maestro e la rete, Milano, Etas, 1999..
 Anna Comacchio, L'ufficio che cambia. Nuove competenze per le professioni impiegatizie, Milano, Etas, 1999..
 Arnaldo Camuffo, Piccoli grandi capi. Competenze per la produzione flessibile, Milano, Etas, 1998, pp. 49–74..
 Giovanni Costa, Andrea Battiston, Paolo Gubitta, Mercato del Lavoro e Master in Business Administration, CLEUP, 1997, pp. 58–109..

External links
 CUOA Foundation website

Business schools in Italy
Universities in Italy
Educational institutions established in 1957
1957 establishments in Italy